Ysgol Dewi Sant is a secondary school in St Davids, Pembrokeshire, Wales.

Description
The school serves the historic city of St Davids and an extensive rural area.

The 2007 Estyn Inspection report commended its strong GCSE and A Levels curriculum.

Closure threats
In 2013 Ysgol Dewi Sant was under review for potential closure, though it was ranked top Welsh school on the Western Mail Real Schools Guide. In December 2014 it was removed from the Estyn list of schools in need of improvement, having improved its teaching across the ability range, and improved security by building a new reception and carrying out more rigorous identity checks.

Despite this Pembrokeshire County Council arranged an extraordinary meeting for the 29 January 2015, to discuss a shake-up of education in Wales, not just Pembrokeshire, including the closure of Ysgol Dewi Sant. Over 300 people protested outside the council meeting. The council decided to keep Ysgol Dewi Sant open but review the future of the sixth form.

Notable pupils

Simon Davies, former Wales international footballer
David Gray, singer-songwriter
Rowland Phillips, former international rugby union player and coach
Ian Walsh, former Wales international footballer
Keith Griffiths (architect), Founder of Aedas

References

External links
School Website

Dewi Sant
Dewi Sant
Educational institutions established in 1895
1895 establishments in Wales
St Davids